Yehonatan Geffen (Heb: יהונתן גפן; born February 22, 1947) also known as Yonatan Gefen, is an Israeli author, poet, songwriter, journalist, and playwright.

Biography 
Geffen was born in moshav Nahalal. He is the father of Aviv Geffen, Shira Geffen and Natasha Geffen, as well as nephew of Moshe Dayan. He has two grandsons.

In 1965, he served as a paratrooper under Matan Vilnai, and became an officer.

In 1967, his mother overdosed on her medication and died. Geffen considers it to have been suicide.

After his discharge from the IDF in 1969 and moving to Tel Aviv, he took up poetry.

In 1972, while Geffen was studying in London, his sister Nurit committed suicide, causing him to return to Tel Aviv.

During this period he began writing a column for the weekend supplement of Ma'ariv, and he joined the entertainment troupe "Lul" with Uri Zohar, Arik Einstein, and Shalom Hanoch. The latter introduced Geffen to his future wife, Nurit Makober.

Geffen was often criticized for his strong left-wing leanings, which bordered on provocation, and even received death threats. He was one of a group of journalists (including Uri Dan, Yeshayahu Ben Porat, Eitan Haber, Hezi Carmel, Eli Landau, and Eli Tavor) who in 1973 published the book The Failure, the first book to document the Yom Kippur War. It criticized the performance of the government and military and also contained first-hand descriptions of battles, casualties, injuries, and the losses and failures of military hardware. The book aroused considerable public interest.

Much of Geffen's success came from his works for children, like the song "HaYalda Hachi Yafa BaGan" ["The Prettiest Girl in Kindergarten"] and the book "HaKeves HaShisha Asar" [The 16th Lamb], but he has also written many popular songs, poems, plays, and stories for adults. He frequently collaborated with David Broza, rendering Spanish songs into Hebrew.

In February 2018, Geffen published a poem on his Instagram feed that ended with the following lines:

Reacting to this, defense minister Avigdor Lieberman demanded that Israel’s popular Army Radio ban Geffen’s work, and culture minister Miri Regev said Geffen was "crossing a red line by someone seeking to rewrite history." Geffen published an apology but didn't remove the poem from his Instagram feed.

References

1947 births
Living people
Dayan family
Israeli male dramatists and playwrights
Israeli Jews
Israeli male poets
Israeli songwriters
Israeli children's writers
Maariv (newspaper) people
Recipients of Prime Minister's Prize for Hebrew Literary Works
People from Nahalal
Paratroopers